Citrine lorikeet has been split into the following species:
 Sula lorikeet, Saudareos flavoviridis
 Yellow-cheeked lorikeet, Saudareos meyeri

Birds by common name